Lindigia is a genus of parasitic flies in the family Tachinidae. There are about five described species in Lindigia.

Species
These five species belong to the genus Lindigia:
 Lindigia browni Curran, 1947
 Lindigia oriunda Reinhard, 1975
 Lindigia plagiata (Schiner, 1868)
 Lindigia varicolor Curran, 1947
 Lindigia vierecki Curran, 1947

References

Further reading

 
 
 
 

Tachinidae
Articles created by Qbugbot